Desoria elegans is a species of springtail from Switzerland.

References

External links 

 Desoria elegans at biolob.cz

Collembola
Animals described in 1899